Begwary is a small hamlet in the parish of Staploe in the Borough of Bedford, Bedfordshire, England.

References

Hamlets in Bedfordshire
Borough of Bedford